Pyridoxal is one form of vitamin B6.

Some medically relevant bacteria, such as those in the genera Granulicatella and Abiotrophia, require pyridoxal for growth. This nutritional requirement can lead to the culture phenomenon of satellite growth. In in vitro culture, these pyridoxal-dependent bacteria may only grow in areas surrounding colonies of bacteria from other genera ("satellitism") that are capable of producing pyridoxal.

Pyridoxal is involved in what is believed to be the most ancient reaction of aerobic metabolism on Earth, about 2.9 billion years ago, a forerunner of the Great Oxidation Event.

See also 
 Pyridoxal phosphate

References 

Vitamins
Hydroxypyridines
Aldehydes
3-Hydroxypropenals
Aromatic ketones